David Holoubek (born 8 June 1980) is a Czech football manager who is currently the manager of Czech Republic U19.

Career

Early career
In his player career he played in 3rd Czech league.
His manager career started in Humpolec. He moved to Prague in 2004 for study sport in Charles University.

Sparta Prague
During his study he started in Sparta Prague as assistant in U15 team. As assistant of Petr Janoušek he trained Ladislav Krejčí, Jiří Skalák or Pavel Kadeřábek.

In 2012, he became head coach at Sparta's U19 team.
In season 2015/16 Sparta U19 won Czech 1st junior league.

In June 2016 he became assistant of Zdeněk Ščasný in Sparta's A-team (he was still coach of U19).
In September 2016 head coach Ščasný was fired after losing the Prague derby against city rivals Slavia Prague with Holoubek becoming acting head coach. Due to not holding a UEFA Pro Licence, his tenure was limited to two months. In November 2016 he was formally replaced by Zdeněk Svoboda. On 21 December 2016 Sparta announced that club sport director Tomáš Požár became head coach and Holoubek first coach. After a poor run of results in March 2017, the whole coaching team was dissolved and Holoubek returned to Sparta's U17 team.

In June 2017 he announced on his Twitter account that he became an owner of UEFA Pro Licence.

Slovan Liberec
On 22 December 2017 Holoubek signed a contract with FC Slovan Liberec. In his coaching squad are former players Miroslav Holeňák, Jiří Jarošík and goalkeeper Marek Čech.

Ružomberok
On 4 June 2018 Holoubek signed a contract with MFK Ružomberok.

Czech Republic national team U18
In February 2020 Holoubek became a manager of Czech Republic U18.

Czech Republic national team
On 6 September 2020, it was announced that Holoubek would take charge of the Czech Republic national team in their match against Scotland on the following day, as the entire squad and coaching staff which played against Slovakia on 4 September had to be replaced due to positive SARS-CoV-2 tests.

References

Living people
People from Humpolec
AC Sparta Prague managers
Czech football managers
1980 births
FC Slovan Liberec managers
MFK Ružomberok managers
Czech Republic national football team managers
Expatriate football managers in Slovakia
Czech expatriate sportspeople in Slovakia
Sportspeople from the Vysočina Region
Charles University alumni